Megataphrus is a genus of cylindrical bark beetles in the family Zopheridae. There are at least three described species in Megataphrus.

Species
These three species belong to the genus Megataphrus:
 Megataphrus arizonicus Stephan, 1989
 Megataphrus chandleri Stephan, 1989
 Megataphrus tenuicornis Casey, 1890

References

Further reading

 
 
 
 

Zopheridae
Articles created by Qbugbot